Fichtel may refer to:
Fichtel Mountains
Fichtel (surname)

See also

Fichtel & Sachs a German family business, today mostly known in automotive industry